Pointillism is a technique of painting in which small, distinct dots of color are applied in patterns to form an image.

Georges Seurat and Paul Signac developed the technique in 1886, branching from Impressionism.  The term "Pointillism" was coined by art critics in the late 1880s to ridicule the works of these artists, but is now used without its earlier pejorative connotation. The movement Seurat began with this technique is known as Neo-impressionism. The Divisionists used a similar technique of patterns to form images, though with larger cube-like brushstrokes.

Technique 
The technique relies on the ability of the eye and mind of the viewer to blend the color spots into a fuller range of tones. It is related to Divisionism, a more technical variant of the method. Divisionism is concerned with color theory, whereas pointillism is more focused on the specific style of brushwork used to apply the paint. It is a technique with few serious practitioners today and is notably seen in the works of Seurat, Signac, and Cross.

From 1905 to 1907, Robert Delaunay and Jean Metzinger painted in a Divisionist style with large squares or 'cubes' of color: the size and direction of each gave a sense of rhythm to the painting, yet color varied independently of size and placement. This form of Divisionism was a significant step beyond the preoccupations of Signac and Cross. In 1906, the art critic Louis Chassevent recognized the difference and, as art historian Daniel Robbins pointed out, used the word "cube" which would later be taken up by Louis Vauxcelles to baptize Cubism. Chassevent writes: 
 M. Metzinger is a mosaicist like M. Signac but he brings more precision to the cutting of his cubes of color which appear to have been made mechanically [...].

Practice 

The practice of Pointillism is in sharp contrast to the traditional methods of blending pigments on a palette. Pointillism is analogous to the four-color CMYK printing process used by some color printers and large presses that place dots of cyan, magenta, yellow and key (black). Televisions and computer monitors use a similar technique to represent image colors using Red, Green, and Blue (RGB) colors.

If red, blue, and green light (the additive primaries) are mixed, the result is something close to white light (see Prism (optics)). Painting is inherently subtractive, but Pointillist colors often seem brighter than typical mixed subtractive colors. This may be partly because subtractive mixing of the pigments is avoided, and because some of the white canvas may be showing between the applied dots.

The painting technique used for Pointillist color mixing is at the expense of the traditional brushwork used to delineate texture.

The majority of Pointillism is done in oil paint. Anything may be used in its place, but oils are preferred for their thickness and tendency not to run or bleed.

Music 

Pointillism also refers to a style of 20th-century music composition. Different musical notes are made in seclusion, rather than in a linear sequence, giving a sound texture similar to the painting version of Pointillism. This type of music is also known as punctualism or klangfarbenmelodie.

Notable artists 

Georges Seurat
Charles Angrand
Chuck Close
Henri-Edmond Cross
Henri Delavallée
Albert Dubois-Pillet
Louis Fabien (pseudonym)
Georges Lemmen
Maximilien Luce
Jean Metzinger
Camille Pissarro
John Roy
Paul Signac
Vincent van Gogh
Théo van Rysselberghe
Hippolyte Petitjean
Jan Toorop
Alfred William Finch

Notable paintings 

 A Sunday Afternoon on the Island of La Grande Jatte by Georges Seurat
 Bathers at Asnières by Georges Seurat
 The Windmills at Overschie by Paul Signac
 Banks of Seine by Georges Seurat
 A Coastal Scene by Théo van Rysselberghe
 Family in the Orchard by Théo van Rysselberghe
 Countryside at Noon by Théo van Rysselberghe
 Afternoon at Pardigon by Henri-Edmond Cross
 Rio San Trovaso, Venice by Henri-Edmond Cross
 The Seine in front of the Trocadero by Henri-Edmond Cross
 The Pine Tree at St. Tropez by Paul Signac]
 Opus 217. Against the Enamel of a Background Rhythmic with Beats and Angles, Tones, and Tints, Portrait of M. Félix Fénéon in 1890 by Paul Signac
 The Yellow Sail, Venice by Paul Signac
 Notre Dame Cathedral by Maximilien Luce
 Le Pont De Pierre, Rouen by Charles Angrand
 The Beach at Heist by Georges Lemmen
 Aline Marechal by Georges Lemmen
 Vase of Flowers by Georges Lemmen
 Two Nudes in an Exotic Landscape by Jean Metzinger

Gallery

See also 
 Halftone
 Klangfarbenmelodie
 Micromontage, similar technique in music
 Stipple engraving
 Pixel art
 Contemporary Indigenous Australian art, the most well-known style of which is known as "dot painting"

References

External links 

Georges Seurat, 1859–1891, a fully digitized exhibition catalog from The Metropolitan Museum of Art Libraries
Signac, 1863–1935, a fully digitized exhibition catalog from The Metropolitan Museum of Art Libraries

 
Artistic techniques
Painting techniques
Post-Impressionism
...